The Orthopedic Foundation for Animals (OFA) is a nonprofit organization based in Columbia, Missouri, that aims to research and prevent orthopedic and hereditary diseases in companion animals.

As a private not-for-profit foundation, the OFA has funded nearly $3 million in research aimed at reducing the incidence and prevalence of inherited companion animal disease. The OFA funds projects through the AKC Canine Health Foundation, the Morris Animal Foundation and occasionally through direct grants. The OFA has achieved Ruby Donor status with MAF, and Millennium Founder status with the AKC CHF. OFA supported research is not limited to orthopedic disease, and has included cancers, heart disease, and thyroid disease as examples. Some research has been breed specific, some for all breeds, some for multiple species, and has been done at many of our leading universities and research institutions. And, with the recent completion of the mapping of the canine genome, the OFA, is focusing more of its research dollars towards research at the molecular level.

The OFA was founded by John M. Olin in 1966, after several of his dogs became affected by hip dysplasia. Originally studying hip dysplasia alone, the OFA has expanded its efforts and now studies and has health databases on a wide range of diseases including elbow dysplasia, patellar luxation, Legg-Calve-Perthes, thyroid, cardiac, congenital deafness, sebaceous adenitis, and shoulder O.C.D. The methodology of the evaluation is considered a subjective method.  There are other methodologies in practice that include a Distraction Index for Penn Hip evaluations, an objective scoring method practiced by the British Veterinary Association, and an evaluative grade based on point by point criterion in the Federation Cynologique International system.

The OFA offers DNA certification for canine degenerative myelopathy, neuronal ceroid lipofuscinosis for American Bulldogs, Fanconi syndrome for Basenjis and neonatal encephalopathy with seizures for Standard Poodles through an exclusive agreement with the University of Missouri.

Online database searches 
The OFA has the largest fully searchable online canine health database in the world, with over 1,000,000 records. Each dog (or cat) who has ever had an OFA certification issued can be searched by name, part of name, or registration number. Results automatically include all OFA certifications for that dog, plus sire, dam, siblings, half-siblings, and offspring.

See also
PennHIP
American Kennel Club

Further reading
 Greg Keller, The use of health databases and selective breeding: A guide for dog and cat breeders and owners 5th edition 2006 OFA accessed at  July 26, 2006

References

External links
 

Animal charities based in the United States
Non-profit organizations based in Columbia, Missouri
Charities based in Missouri